Pygarctia is a genus of moths in the family Erebidae.

Species
Pygarctia abdominalis Grote, 1871 – yellow-edged pygarctia moth
Pygarctia angelus (Dyar, 1907)
Pygarctia eglenensis (Clemens, 1861)
Pygarctia flavidorsalis Barnes & McDunnough, 1913
Pygarctia haematodes Dyar, 1921
Pygarctia lorula Dyar, 1914
Pygarctia matudai (Beutelspacher, 1978)
Pygarctia murina (Stretch, 1885)
Pygarctia neomexicana Barnes, 1904
Pygarctia pterygostigma Dyar, 1909
Pygarctia roseicapitis (Neumoegen & Dyar, 1893)
Pygarctia spraguei (Grote, 1875) – Sprague's pygarctia moth

References
Arctiidae genus list at Butterflies and Moths of the World of the Natural History Museum

Phaegopterina
Moth genera